Whateley Hall (not to be confused with Whately Hall in Banbury) was a stately home in the Warwickshire countryside near Castle Bromwich.

The house was owned by the owners of Barrells Hall, the Newtons of Glencripesdale Estate. A housing estate was built on the house and grounds in 1935 when it was demolished

History 

The house was set over three main levels and built in the classical Palladian influenced style with pilasters and pediment and set in gardens and pleasure grounds 

The architect of the house and its date is unknown with very little documentation existing regarding it

The Newtons, a wealthy local family lived in the house even after buying the Barrells Hall estate in 1856, continuing to use Whateley Hall as the residence of the second son, William Newton III, vicar of Rotherham however it was sold in 1881 to the Knight family, local printers following his death in 1879.

The house sold to Fred Hayles & Co of Castle Bromwich in 1935 and demolished and what was known as the Whateley Hall Estate  of new houses was built on the land. Today Birmingham has grown so much that it encompasses Castle Bromwich, back then it was open fields as shown by various maps

All that remains of the Neo Palladian house is the Lodge on the edge of Whateley Green

Ownership

The Newtons 
William Newton II and his wife, Mary Whincopp, lived in the house with their children Goodwin Newton, William Newton III, Canon Horace Newton, and Mary Rosa (who later married Henry Cheetham, Bishop of Sierra Leone.

After 1856, Barrells Hall became the main house in the family (see above), in addition to the large ) estate in Scotland Glencripesdale House/Castle on the Glencripesdale Estate, and Canon Horace Newton's house Holmwood, Redditch nearby (which was designed for Horace Newton by the architect, and his relative Temple Lushington Moore).

The family owned whole streets of commercial property in Birmingham, including part of New Street, as well as welsh slate quarries and mines in Llanberis via the Llanberis Slate Company, including Bryn Bras Castle.

The Knights 
The Knight family purchased the house after 1881 and lived there until it was sold in 1935.

References 

Country houses in Warwickshire